An extremely rare banknote that was issued in 1815 at Fort Michilimackinac, Michigan, United States, by an occupation force from the British Army.

Catalogue

PS1347A. 4 Dollars. 1 May 1815.

References

Standard Catalog of World Paper Money, Specialized Issues (10th Edition). Edited by George S. Cuhaj. Published by Krause Publications.

Fort Michilmackinac
Banknotes of military authorities